Good Luck to the Rider (1953) is the first children's book by Australian author Joan Phipson; it was illustrated by Margaret Horder.  It was joint winner of the Children's Book of the Year Award: Older Readers in 1953.

Story outline
Barbara Trevor is the youngest of four children living on their parents' farm in country Australia.  Barbara has acquired a horse, which she calls Rosinante, though she doesn't know the origin of the name. The book follows her attempts to school her horse and come to terms with her own life.

Critical reception
In a survey of children's books to signal the commencement of Children's Book Week in 1953 a reviewer in The Sunday Herald (Sydney) stated: "Australian country life is well described in a wholesome story. All the characters ring true. The Trevors are an unaffected family. Their homestead is typical of many in this broad land, and the four children act and live like normal children...There are no contrived adventures; it is a natural, easy flowing story which will entertain and absorb the attention of its readers. Margaret Horder's illustrations have caught the spirit of the book, and particularly of Rosinante." Kirkus Reviews praised the author's handling of the material: "When uncertain girl meets unwanted horse, it's bound to be love at first sight, confidence in the last chapter, but with Joan Phipson putting the familiar plot through its paces almost every moment counts".

Awards
 1953 - winner Children's Book of the Year Award: Older Readers

See also
 1953 in Australian literature

References

Australian children's novels
1953 Australian novels
Pony books
Novels set in Australia
CBCA Children's Book of the Year Award-winning works
1953 children's books
Angus & Robertson books